Kalagi has several meanings, including:

 Kalagi, a town located in the Western Division of the Gambia
 Kalagi, Mukono, a town located in Mukono District, Uganda
 Kalagi, Mubende, a town located in Mubende District, Uganda